Instinct is a 2019 Dutch drama film directed by Halina Reijn. It was screened in the Contemporary World Cinema section at the 2019 Toronto International Film Festival. It was selected as the Dutch entry for the Best International Feature Film at the 92nd Academy Awards, but it was not nominated.

Plot
A prison therapist becomes obsessed with her charismatic patient, a violent serial rapist on the verge of being paroled.

Cast
 Carice van Houten as Nicoline
 Marwan Kenzari as Idris
 Marie-Mae van Zuilen as Marieke
 Pieter Embrechts as Alex
 Ariane Schluter as Directrice

Release
Instinct premiered at the 72nd Locarno Film Festival. A24 acquired the rights to the film in 2022.

See also
 List of submissions to the 92nd Academy Awards for Best International Feature Film
 List of Dutch submissions for the Academy Award for Best International Feature Film

References

External links
 

2019 films
2019 drama films
2019 psychological thriller films
2010s prison films
Dutch drama films
2010s Dutch-language films